Elmayurdu is a village in Karaman Province, Turkey

Its population was 652 as of 2009

References

Central Anatolia Region